Boris Belyayev (born 23 February 1933) is a Soviet athlete. He competed in the men's shot put at the 1956 Summer Olympics.

References

External links
 

1933 births
Living people
Athletes (track and field) at the 1956 Summer Olympics
Soviet male shot putters
Olympic athletes of the Soviet Union
Place of birth missing (living people)